Minister for Energy is a position in the government of Western Australia, currently held by Bill Johnston of the Labor Party. The position was first created after the 1959 state election, for the government of David Brand, and has existed in almost every government since then. The minister is responsible for Energy Policy WA (a standalone sub-department of the state's Department of Mines, Industry Regulation and Safety), which oversees Western Australia's energy sector.

Titles
 2 April 1959 – 12 October 1971: Minister for Electricity
 12 October 1971 – 6 July 1972 (two ministers): Minister for Electricity and Minister for Fuel
 6 July 1972 – 1 April 1974: Minister for Electricity and Fuel
 1 April 1974 – 16 February 1993: Minister for Fuel and Energy
 16 February 1993 – present: Minister for Energy

List of ministers

See also
 Minister for Mines and Petroleum (Western Australia)
 Minister for Regional Development (Western Australia)
 Minister for State Development (Western Australia)

References
 David Black (2014), The Western Australian Parliamentary Handbook (Twenty-Third Edition). Perth [W.A.]: Parliament of Western Australia.

Energy
Minister for Energy
Energy in Western Australia